Wytch Hazel is an English hard rock and heavy metal band that originated in 2011. The band is currently signed to Bad Omen Records.

History 
Wytch Hazel was formed in 2011. Originally, the band went with the name Jerusalem, which of course, had already been taken. Wytch Hazel began with the lineup of Colin Hendra on guitars and vocals, Josh Winnard on guitars, Cornelius Corkery on bass, and Aaron Hay on drums. In 2012, the band released their debut EP, titled The Truth, which came out independently. The band released two other split releases in 2012, one titled Vol. 1, which also featured Asmovel, Eliminator, and Ascalon, and Borrowed Time / Wytch Hazel, which featured Borrowed Time. By the time the band began to write and record their debut album, a majority of the lineup changed, with Hendra and Corkery remaining, with Winnard and Hay departing, as well as Winnard's replacement Matt Gatley, also departing by 2015. Alex Haslam (Big Al) joined the band in 2015 on guitars, with Jack Spencer taking over Hay’s position in 2013. In 2016, the band released their debut album, titled Prelude, which was released through Bad Omen Records. In 2018, the band recorded and released their sophomore album, which was titled II: Sojourn, also being released through Bad Omen, and was well received. In 2020, the band released their third album, III: Pentecost, which was highly praised by several reviewers.

Influences, style and beliefs 
Founding member Colin Hendra states that Iron Maiden is one of the band's influences.
Alex Haslam (Big Al) confirmed that other influences included Led Zeppelin, Wishbone Ash and Jethro Tull. Several reviewers compared the band to other artists like Blue Öyster Cult, Thin Lizzy, and Deep Purple.

While Wytch Hazel's lyrical content is very much oriented by themes of Christianity of lyrics, written by Hendra, they do not claim to be a Christian band. Hendra states that he is a Christian, Corkery is a Roman Catholic, and Winnard and Spencer are agnostics. The theme is very present in a majority of their songs, with many reviewers pointing this out.

Members 
Last known line up
 Colin Hendra – guitar, vocals (2011–present)
 Alex Haslam (Big Al) – guitar (2015–present)
 Andrew Shackleton – bass (2019–present)
 Aaron Hay (2011-2013, 2022-present)

Former;
 Jack Spencer – drums (2013–present)
 Josh Winnard – guitar, vocals (2011–2013)
 Matt Gatley – guitar (2013–2015)
 Cornelius "Neil" Corkery – bass (2011–2017)

Timeline

Discography 
Studio albums
 Prelude (2016)
 II: Sojourn (2018)
 III: Pentecost (2020)

EPs
 The Truth (2012)

Splits
 Vol. 1 (2012)
 Borrowed Time / Wytch Hazel (2012)

Compilations
 Surrender & the Truth (2013)

References

External links 

Musical groups established in 2011
Christian metal musical groups
2011 establishments in England
English hard rock musical groups
English folk metal musical groups
Musical groups from Lancashire